The first season of The Bachelor New Zealand premiered on March 17, 2015. The season stars Arthur "Art" Green, a 27 year old personal trainer and entrepreneur from Wellington, courting 21 women.

Contestants

The following is the list of bachelorettes for season one:

Call-out order

 This contestant won
 This contestant received one of the first impression roses
 This contestant received a rose during the date
 This contestant received a rose outside of a date or the rose ceremony
 This contestant was eliminated
 This contestant quit

Episodes

Episode 1

Nothing is true

Episode 2

Single Date: Poppy – Took a seaplane to a beach, went kayaking and had a picnic on the shore.

Group Date: Chrystal, Dani, Danielle B., Danielle L., Kristie, Lisa, Matilda, Natalie & Shivani - Took a super yacht into the harbor. Chrystal and Danielle L. went biscuiting with Arthur and Dani went tandem jet-skiing with him.

Eliminated: Cristy & Natasha

Episode 3

Single Date: Matilda – Climbed the Auckland Harbour Bridge and went bungy jumping followed by a picnic on the bridge.

Group Date: Alysha, Amanda, Brigette, Carrisa & Kristie - Rally driving competition. Kristie was the fastest girl and got some time alone with Arthur.

Quit: Danielle L. – She left because she could not get past the age difference and didn't think they'd fall in love. The rest of the girls who had not been given roses were all given one.

Episode 4

Single Date: Amanda - Took a drive to Muriwai where they played golf. Then went beach where they had a dinner in Moroccan style gazebo while a string quartet played.

Group Date: Alysha, Chrystal, Hayley, Lisa, Natalie & Poppy - Took the girls to the alligator pit at the zoo where they worked together and cleaned it. Poppy was the girl who impressed Arthur the most and so they had one on one time and fed the lemurs.

Eliminated: Lisa

Episode 5

Single Date: Dani - Went zip-lining through the bush and had a picnic.

Group Date: Amanda, Brigette, Carrisa, Danielle B., Hayley, Kristie, Matilda, Natalie, Poppy & Shivani - The girls went laser skeet shooting on Waiheke Island. Hayley was the girl who did best and had a one on one archery tutorial with Arthur.

Eliminated: Hayley

Episode 6

Single Date: Chrystal - They took a Japanese cooking class and made sushi together. Chrystal received a dress selected by Art and was taken on a glamorous date at the museum where they had the sushi they made for dinner. Afterwards they went to the roof of the museum to admire the skyline where Art gave Chrystal some diamond earrings.
  
Group Date: All of the bachelorettes attended the group date. The girls were made up and strutted their stuff on the catwalk in front of Art. Dani was chosen as the best and took part in a photo-shoot with Art.

Eliminated: Shivani

Episode 7

Single Date: Alysha - Was taken wine tasting and then they had a picnic in the vineyard.

Group Date: Chrystal, Brigette, Dani, Danielle B., Kristie & Natalie - They were taken to a trampoline park where they played dodge ball. Dani was deemed the best and won some time alone with Arthur.

Eliminated: Brigette & Carrisa

Episode 8

Single Date: Natalie - Was taken on a super-yacht and they went paddle boarding in the harbor at sunset. Later they got cozy and had dinner on the boat.

Group Date: Amanda, Chrystal, Danielle B., Matilda & Poppy - All had a pool party with Arthur.

Eliminated: Amanda

Episode 9

Single Date: Kristie - Went swimming near a spring with a waterfall in the Bay of Plenty. Kristie had a panic attack in the water after diving in and Art helped her to shore. Afterwards the pair had a couples massage followed by a picnic at sunset on a hilltop.

Group Date: All of the bachelorettes attended the group date where they went horseback riding. Matilda's horse got rowdy and she fell off and was taken to hospital where she was told she broke her wrist. Art later gave her a rose at the hospital.

Eliminated: No one - Kristie and Natalie were the last two girls left. Art left the ceremony and on his return chose not to send anyone home.

Episode 10

Single Date: Poppy. - Went skydiving together and berry picking after they landed. They then went swimming in a river and got cozy at a lodge.

Single Date: Danielle B. - Went blo-kart racing. Later they roasted marshmallows and got warm by a bonfire on the beach.

Eliminated: Kristie

Quit: Danielle B. - Although Art gave her a rose on their date, Danielle decided she didn't feel any chemistry with him and returned it to him at the cocktail party and left the mansion.

Episode 11

Single Date: Alysha - Took a helicopter to White Island where they had a tour. Later they had a picnic overlooking the ocean followed by a swim in the sea. Alysha revealed she was once married before.

Group Date: Chrystal, Dani, Matilda & Natalie - Played doubles tennis with Arthur and went to a food truck where they had burgers. Chrystal was taken to the nearby schoolhouse to be alone with Art where he showed her a bit about his childhood. Natalie was picked for one on one time with Art and they sat in the barn and were serenaded by Tiki Taane.

Eliminated: Natalie

Episode 12

Single Date: Matilda - Go for an airplane ride and paddle in the lake in some tranquil gardens.

Group Date: Alysha & Dani - Go sea fishing on a boat with Art. Dani whisked Art away for alone time leaving Alysha by herself, before she had some time with Art herself.

Eliminated: Chrystal

Episodes 13/14
Art visited the homes and families of Alysha, Dani, Matilda and Poppy. Art won over Matilda's father and was grilled harshly by Dani's stepmother in episode 13. In episode 14 Poppy's mother and friend liked Art, while Art tried to find out from Alysha's parents if she was ready for a relationship after her divorce.

Eliminated: Poppy

Episode 15
Dani goes surfing with Art on the Gold Coast and they spend the night together. Matilda and art paddle in a gondola and have dinner and dessert on a penthouse balcony. Alysha goes with Art on a helicopter tour and land at a health and spa retreat.

Eliminated: Alysha

Episode 16 (Finale)
Winner: Matilda - Art gave Matilda a promise ring and asked her to start a relationship with him.
Runner-up: Dani

Notes

References

2015 New Zealand television seasons
New Zealand 01
Television shows filmed in New Zealand